is a Buddhist temple in Onomichi, Hiroshima Prefecture belonging to the Seizan Zenrin-ji of Jōdo-shū Buddhism. Its principal image is a seated image of Amida Nyōrai. The temple houses a National Treasure, an 1153 Heian Period hanging scroll of Fugen Enmei (Samantabhadra).

See also
List of National Treasures of Japan (paintings)

References

Buddhist temples in Hiroshima Prefecture
Jōdo-shū
Pure Land temples
Onomichi, Hiroshima